Hartney is an unincorporated urban community in the Municipality of Grassland within the Canadian province of Manitoba that held town status prior to January 1, 2015. It along the Souris River. Originally established in 1882, the community is named after James Harvey Hartney, an early postmaster in the district.

The Hollywood film The Lookout featuring Jeff Daniels and Joseph Gordon-Levitt, and the film The Stone Angel featuring Ellen Burstyn, were filmed in Hartney in 2006; taking advantage of such buildings as the community's grain elevator and museum.

Hartney's local Member of Legislative Assembly is Doyle Piwniuk and the Member of Parliament for the area is Brandon—Souris MP Larry Maguire.

Six kilometres west of Hartney are the Lauder Sand Hills.

Demographics 

Notable people 
Lew Morrison – NHL hockey player
Corey Peloquin – professional wrestler best known as Chi Chi Cruz
Reg Atkinson – former mayor of Hartney and Brandon
Henry Champ - Canadian broadcaster with CTV, CBC and NBC News

Gallery

References

External links 

 Former Town of Hartney website

Designated places in Manitoba
Former towns in Manitoba
Populated places disestablished in 2015